Gleneagles Hospital is a private hospital on Napier Road, Singapore next to Napier MRT station. It provides medical and surgical services. It is part of Parkway Pantai, itself a subsidiary of the Malaysian–Singaporean private healthcare group IHH Healthcare.

History
Gleneagles Hospital started out as a 45-bed nursing home in 1957. The British European Association, which was established during a time where Singapore was slowly gaining independence from the United Kingdom, was the original founder of Glenagles Hospital.

On 16 January 1958, Gleneagles Nursing Home was incorporated as a private company that came to be known as Gleneagles Hospital Limited. The hospital first opened its doors to the public on 8 June 1959.  In 1979, it evolved into a 126-bed hospital that provides a wider range of medical services. From 1979 to 1980, the small 45-bed nursing home was slowly expanded into a 126-bed "medical center".

Parkway Holdings then acquired Glenagles Hospital in May 1987 for S$46 million. Parkway Holdings continued the expansion from 1988 to 1991. Spending S$150 million, Gleneagles Hospital was transformed into a modern hospital. The new additions were a new 10-storey hospital block, 14 operating theaters and 150 consulting suites. Parkway Holdings did not stop at superficial improvements.  Gleneagles Hospital also expanded its range of services to include hospital management and consultancy services.

In 1993, Gleneagles transformed into a tertiary care hospital. One year later, Gleneagles Hospital was commissioned with 150 medical specialists. In 1997, the hospital had expanded to a 380-bed institution.

At present, there are more than 160 specialists specializing in more than 30 specialties. It is widely known for having a good patient care record.

Location
The current address of the hospital at 6A Napier Road, Singapore 258500 is where the old Gleneagles Hotel was located.  Located across from the Singapore Botanical Gardens, Gleneagles Hotel was built as a luxury, leisure hotel. It had long lounges and wide windows. These features were adapted into the current hospital layout, allowing for a relatively different hospital environment, as compared to the other hospitals in Singapore.

Awards and innovations
Gleneagles Hospital was awarded the Joint Commission International Accreditation (JCI) in 2006, certifying that the hospital satisfies the international standard of care and hospital management, with the Gold Seal of Approval.

In 2002 the Asian American Liver Center in Gleneagles Hospital became the first hospital in South East Asia to perform a living donor liver transplant for children, a high-risk but potentially life-saving procedure. The Asian American Liver Center uses modern technology which helps doctors reconstruct liver anatomy from CT scans, facilitating more accurate diagnosis and precision in operations.

Partnerships
Gleneagles is in forged partnerships with institutions including Johns Hopkins University and Hospital (United States), Thames Valley University (United Kingdom), Curtin University of Technology and La Trobe University (Australia). Besides working with international institutions, Gleneagles collaborates locally with other hospitals in times of crisis. In July 2013, in response to the surge in dengue cases, Gleneagles Hospital collaborated with public hospital Changi General Hospital, using its beds to accommodate public hospital patients.

Controversies
In 2013 a patient, Mr Li Siu Lun, 54, sued Gleneagles Hospital and was awarded S$250,000 in damages, compensatory damages of $10,000 and $240,000 aggravated damages for distress. He claimed that the hospital conspired with a private practitioner, Dr. Looi Kok Poh, to make Mr Li undergo additional surgery in order to cover up a botched hand operation. Mr. Li claimed that Gleneagles Hospital had altered his consent form and medical records in order to help Dr. Looi cover up his negligence. On appeal by Gleneagles and counter-appeal, general damages of $21,000 and aggravated damages of $42,000 were awarded.

See also
 Mochtar Riady
 Robert Mugabe, who died in Gleneagles Hospital on 6 September 2019.

References

Hospitals established in 1957
Hospitals in Singapore
Tanglin